The Royal Malaysia Police Air Operation Force (Malay: Pasukan Gerakan Udara PDRM (PGU)) is a special unit of Royal Malaysia Police (RMP). They look after national security by surveillance and patrol from the air and help other national security agencies.

History

Started in February 1978, when the cabinet gave approval to RMP to set up the unit. All RMP's aircraft property were registered under the control the civil registration. The unit formally established on 1 February 1979 and the title of the commander units at that time known as Air Wing Chief with turnover four units type aircraft Cessna 206G. On 7 April 1980, PGU began the flight operation in Peninsular Malaysia.

The Sungai Besi Air Base was the Air Wing's main operating base in the peninsular apart from the training base in Sultan Azlan Shah Airport, Perak. The Air Wing also operates from two other bases namely in Kuching International Airport, Sarawak and Kota Kinabalu International Airport, Sabah.

On 19 March 2018, its new peninsular airbase was inaugurated at Sultan Abdul Aziz Shah Airport, Selangor. The new air base is located at the southern end of the runway.

Roles

PGU's role is to make surveillance from the air on the east coast and hinterland  checking for pirate activities, smuggling and others criminal activities. Other than that PGU is also responsible to answer help calls by other branches RMP by observation through the air. This unit also responsible for rapid deployment of special forces and to ferry senior police officers. Currently, PGU owns 14 helicopter, 6 Cessna 208 Caravan, 5 Pilatus PC-6 Porter and 5 Beechcraft Super King Air fixed wing aircraft. In addition, PGU also operates unmanned aerial vehicle for surveillance role.

List of Air Wing Commanding Officer

Aircraft

Royal Malaysia Police Air Operations Force or Pasukan Gerakan Udara (PGU) is a special aviation unit of Royal Malaysia Police. This unit operates both fixed wing aircraft and helicopter. Currently the aircraft of the PGU consist of Cessna Caravan, Pilatus PC6 Porter and Beechcraft King Air for fixed wing aircraft and Eurocopter AS355s and Agusta Westland AW139s for helicopter. Unmanned aerial vehicle also operated under PGU branch.

In popular culture 
Gerak Khas 
Polis Evo
J Revolusi
Roda-Roda Kuala Lumpur 
Sindiket 
Akademi Polis S2 to S6 
Pasukan Gerakan Marin 
Esok Masih Ada

References

Royal Malaysia Police
Police aviation